The men's masters competition at the 2010 Asian Games in Guangzhou was held from 23 November to 24 November 2010 at Tianhe Bowling Hall.

The Masters event comprises the top 16 bowlers (maximum two per country) from the all-events competition.

Schedule
All times are China Standard Time (UTC+08:00)

Results

Preliminary

Stepladder finals

References 

Results at ABF Website
Bowling Digital

External links
Bowling Site of 2010 Asian Games

Men's masters